Ukai is a census town in Tapi district in the Indian state of Gujarat.

Demographics
 India census, Ukai had a population of 10,858. Males constitute 54% of the population and females 46%. Ukai has an average literacy rate of 76%, higher than the national average of 59.5%: male literacy is 84%, and female literacy is 67%. In Ukai, 10% of the population is under 6 years of age.

Ukai has the second largest dam in Gujarat built on Tapti River. The project's name is Vallabh Sagar Sarovar Project. A hydropower station is based on the dam, creating a capacity of 300MW of hydroelectricity.

The Thermal Power Station having 840MW Capacity with 5 Units is a major industry in Ukai. It resides at the left bank Canal of Tapti River.
and again Ukai power plant expand with 500 mW capacity new Unit-6 started in 2013. So in Ukai power plant capacity are 1350 MW.
Ukai converted to Tapi district in place of Surat.

In Ukai as per industrial view there are two big companies in the government and private sector.
1)J.K. paper mills ltd, Gunasada it is situated in between Ukai and Fort-songadh.

2)Thermal & hydropower plant
Ukai is totally government sector land. So it's all areas are distributed in sector wise.
sector 1 to 6 have different area names. The areas are Bhuriwel, Patharda colony, 24 bungalow, 500 quarters.

References

Neighbourhoods in Surat
Cities and towns in Tapi district